The Pires do Rio Microregion is a statistical region of south-central Goiás state, Brazil.  The most important city is Pires do Rio.  The area includes 10 municipalities with a population of 90,327 (2007) in an area of 9,449.80 km2. The most populous municipality in the region is Pires do Rio with 26,857 inhabitants and the least populous is Palmelo with 2,260 inhabitants. The largest municipality in land area is Silvânia with 2,860.1 km2 and the smallest is Palmelo with 59 km2.  Palmelo is the smallest municipality in the state of Goiás.

Municipalities 
The microregion consists of the following municipalities:

See also
List of municipalities in Goiás
Microregions of Goiás

References

Microregions of Goiás